McPharlin is a surname. Notable people with the surname include:

Luke McPharlin (born 1981), Australian rules footballer
Marjorie Batchelder McPharlin (1903–1997), American puppeteer
Paul McPharlin (1903–1948), American puppeteer
Ray McPharlin (1916–1991), Australian politician
Tegan McPharlin (born 1988), Australian cricketer

See also
Court–McPharlin Ministry, a Western Australian ministry